Jogandabhavi is a panchayat village in Shorapur taluka of Yadgir district in Karnataka state, India. Jogandabhavi is 8.5 km south-southwest of Kodekal. The nearest railhead is in Yadgir.

The sub-villages of Jogandabhavi village are:  Belligundi tanda, Basirigid tanda, Doddachepi tanda, Gaddad tanda, Laxmikeri tanda, and Sanachepi tanda.

There are five villages in the Jogandabhavi gram panchayat: Jogandabhavi, Ammapur (S.K), Hullikera, Kotigud, and Rayangola.

Demographics 
 census, Jogandabhavi had 2,615 inhabitants, with 1,308 males and 1,307 females.

Notes

External links 
 

Villages in Yadgir district